Mount Hussey  is a mountain  high, rising from the spur at the head of Gruendler Glacier, in the Victory Mountains of Victoria Land, Antarctica. It was mapped by the United States Geological Survey from surveys and U.S. Navy air photos, 1960–64, and was named by the Advisory Committee on Antarctic Names for Keith M. Hussey, a geologist at McMurdo Station, 1966–67.

References

Mountains of Victoria Land
Borchgrevink Coast